Nanjing 1937 may refer to:

Don't Cry, Nanking, also known as Nanjing 1937, 1995 film by Wu Ziniu
Nanjing 1937: A Love Story, 1996 Chinese novel by Ye Zhaoyan

See also
Battle of Nanking (1937)
Nanjing Massacre (1937–1938)